The Nissan Ariya is an electric car produced by the Japanese marque Nissan. The compact crossover was introduced in July 2020 as the brand's first battery-electric SUV. It is produced at its Tochigi plant in Japan since January 2022. The US launch of the Ariya was planned for the second half of 2021, but was delayed to 2022.

Overview 
Originally slated to hit the market in 2021 at a starting price of $40,000, the Ariya production version was unveiled in July 2020. Due to the chip shortage caused by the COVID-19 pandemic, the Ariya's launch was delayed to 2022 from its original 2021 launch.

In November 2021, pricing was revealed for the US market. Deliveries began in the US in the fall of 2022 for the 2023 model year.

The Ariya is available in both front-wheel drive and all-wheel drive (e-4ORCE) variants and with a 63 kWh or 87 kWh battery size. The 63 kWh battery is only available on the Engage base trim. Standard technology on the Ariya includes Nissan's Safety Shield 360 system, which includes the ProPILOT driver assist system. The more advanced ProPILOT 2.0 system, which allows hands-free driving under certain conditions in available on some trims.

Specification

Concept cars 

The Nissan Ariya concept car was presented on 24 October 2019 at the 2019 Tokyo Motor Show. The concept car was fitted with 21-inch rims, LED headlamps and an illuminated logo on its grille, which itself takes the form of a large "V" characteristic of Nissan design. Inside, the dashboard is equipped with two 12.3-inch screens assembled to form a large screen, from which ProPilot 2.0, the second generation of Nissan's driver assistance system, is controlled. The manufacturer has not distributed information on the capacity of the battery to be used in the production Ariya, but indicated that it will be recharged by direct current (DC) compatible with standard CHAdeMO. It will accelerate from zero to 60 miles per hour in 5.1 seconds. The Ariya will support the CCS standard in the US and Europe.

Ariya Single Seater 

The Ariya Single Seater Concept was unveiled in December 2021, as part of the manufacturer's Futures event. The concept car, which is a demonstration of an all-electric motorsports vehicle similar to ones used in Formula E racing, shares its powertrain with the Ariya SUV. The concept also shares multiple design cues with its SUV counterpart, including the illuminated "V" shape at its front and its overall form, which, according to the Nissan, "looks like it was shaped by the air itself". Tommaso Volpe, who is the manufacturer's global motorsports director, stated that the Ariya Single Seater Concept acts as "a powerful demonstration of just how thrilling electric vehicles could be."

References

External links

 

Ariya
Cars introduced in 2020
Compact sport utility vehicles
Crossover sport utility vehicles
Production electric cars
Front-wheel-drive vehicles
All-wheel-drive vehicles
Euro NCAP small off-road
Electric concept cars